The "Red Terror" Martyrs' Memorial Museum in Addis Ababa was established in 2010 as a memorial to those who died during the Red Terror under the Derg government. The museum has displays of torture instruments, skulls and bones, coffins, bloody clothes and photographs of victims. In free tours of the museum, guides describes the history leading up to the Red Terror (starting from Haile Selassie's 80th birthday celebration), the actions taken toward citizens who opposed the Derg, how the prisoners were treated and how they secretly communicated among each other.

The museum also features pictorial history of the Red Terror.

See also
Red Terror (Ethiopia)
Derg

References

External links
Website

Museums established in 2010
2010 establishments in Ethiopia
Buildings and structures in Addis Ababa
Culture in Addis Ababa
Museums of communism
Museums in Ethiopia
21st-century architecture in Ethiopia